Lena Zavaroni in South Africa was the third album by the Scottish singer Lena Zavaroni, released in 1975 by the Record and Tape Company.

Track listing
 "If My Friends Could See Me Now" (Coleman/Fields)
 "The Tennessee Wig-Walk" (Gimbel/Coleman)
 "Rock-a-Bye Your Baby with a Dixie Melody" L(ewis/Young/Schwartz)
 "Kiss Me, Honey Honey, Kiss Me" (Timothy/Julien)
 "Ma! (He's Making Eyes At Me)" (Conrad/Clare)
 "Music, Music, Music" (Weiss/Baum)
 "Stage Struck" (Mercer/Previn)
 "Country Roads" (Denver)
 "Help Me Make It Through The Night"
 "Swinging on a Star" (Burke/Van Heusen)
 "What a Wonderful World" (Douglas/Weiss)

Personnel
 Lena Zavaroni – vocals

References

1975 albums
Lena Zavaroni albums